Butön Rinchen Drup, (1290–1364), 11th Abbot of Shalu Monastery, was a 14th-century Sakya master and Tibetan Buddhist leader. Shalu was the first of the major monasteries to be built by noble families of the Tsang dynasty during Tibet's great revival of Buddhism, and was an important center of the Sakya tradition. Butön was not merely a capable administrator but he is remembered to this very day as a prodigious scholar and writer and is Tibet's most celebrated historian.

Biography 
Buton was born in 1290, "to a family associated with a monastery named Sheme Gomne (shad smad sgom gnas) in the Tropu (khro phu) area of Tsang ... [his] father was a prominent Nyingma Lama named Drakton Gyeltsen Pelzang (brag ston rgyal btshan dpal bzang, d.u.). His mother, also a Nyingma master, was called Sonam Bum (bsod nams 'bum, d.u.)."

Buton catalogued all of the Buddhist scriptures at Shalu, some 4,569 religious and philosophical works and formatted them in a logical, coherent order. He wrote the famous book, the History of Buddhism in India and Tibet at Shalu which many Tibetan scholars utilize in their study today.

After his death he strongly influenced the development of esoteric studies and psychic training in Tibet for centuries. The purpose of his works were not to cultivate paranormal magical abilities but to attain philosophical enlightenment, a belief that all earthly phenonoma are a state of the mind. He remains to this day one of the most important Tibetan historians and Buddhist writers in the history of Buddhism and Tibet.

Panchen Sönam Drakpa (1478-1554), the fifteenth abbot of Ganden monastery, became known as an incarnation of the great lama and historian, Bütön Rinchen Drupa.

See also
Zhentong
Drakpa Gyaltsen (1147-1216)
Tulku Dragpa Gyaltsen (1619-1656)

Sources

Further reading

Chandra, Lokesh ed. The Collected Works of Bu-ston 26v. (Śatapiṭaka Series 64)  New Delhi: International Academy of Indian Culture, 1971.
Rinchen Namgyal, Dratshdpa (Author), Van Der Bogaert, Hans (Translator) A Handful of Flowers: A Brief Biography of Buton Rinchen Drub. Dharamsala: Library of Tibetan Works and Archives, 1996.  
Ruegg, David Seyfort. The life of Bu ston Rin po che: With the Tibetan text of the Bu ston rNam thar, Serie orientale Roma XXXIV. Roma: Instituto italiano per il Medio ed Estremo Oriente, 1966.
Schaeffar, Kurtis R. “A letter to the editors of the Buddhist canon in fourteenth-century Tibet: the yig mkhan rnams la gdams pa of Bu ston Rin chen grub.” in The Journal of the American Oriental Society  01-APR-2004
Obermiller, E. (1931/1932) The History of Buddhism in India and Tibet. the Jewelry of Scripture, by Bu Ston, Translated from Tibetan. Leipzig: Harrassowitz. v.1 v.2.

External links
rgyal mtshan dpal bzang ( b. 13th cent. ) 
TBRC P155 Bu ston Rin chen grub
TBRC Outline of the Collected Works of Bu ston Rin chen grub 
Buddhism Dictionary: Butön rin-chen-grup
Butön Rinchen Drup, Rigpa Wiki

Sakya lamas
Tibetan Buddhism writers
Tibetan historians
Tibetan Buddhist monks
Tibetan Buddhists from Tibet
13th-century Tibetan people
14th-century Tibetan people
13th-century lamas
14th-century lamas